Jocelyn Golden wrote Learning To Be Me - My Twenty-Three-Year Battle with Bulimia in October 2005. It has gained attention as being one of the most in-depth accounts of extreme bulimia. Her battle from the age of 13 involved two surgeries including losing her large intestine. Today she writes and speaks on the subject of bulimia and related issues.

External links
 http://www.learningtobeme.com
 Jocelyn Golden Interview CBS Harrisburg
 http://www.alliancecounselingcenter.org/downloads/EatingDisorderReadingList.pdf
 https://web.archive.org/web/20080518033943/http://www.gurze.com/client/client_pages/speakers.cfm

Year of birth missing (living people)
Living people
21st-century American women writers
American women non-fiction writers
21st-century American non-fiction writers